USS Herreshoff No. 306 (SP-1841), also written Herreshoff #306, was a United States Navy patrol vessel in commission from 1918 to 1922.

Construction, acquisition, and commissioning
At the urging of Assistant Secretary of the Navy (and future President of the United States) Franklin D. Roosevelt (1882-1945), the industrialist, financier, and philanthropist Alfred I. DuPont (1864-1935) of Wilmington, Delaware, contracted with the Herreshoff Manufacturing Company at Bristol, Rhode Island, for one of a small group of 60-ton steel-hulled boats built to a naval patrol boat design for private owners with the intention that they would be made available to the U.S. Navy in time of war. Du Ponts boat, with the builders name Herreshoff No. 306, was completed in 1917.

On 14 February 1918, the U.S. Navy purchased Herreshoff No. 306 from du Pont for use as a section patrol boat during World War I. She was commissioned at Newport, Rhode Island, as USS Herreshoff No. 306 (SP-1841) on 27 February 1918.

Operational history
Herreshoff No. 306 proceeded to New London, Connecticut, in company with two other Herreshoff-built boats to be fitted with listening gear. She departed New London on 5 May 1918 in company with the patrol boats  and  bound for the Panama Canal Zone, stopping at Charleston, South Carolina; Key West, Florida; and Guantanamo Bay, Cuba, en route. She arrived at Cristóbal in the Canal Zone on 1 June 1918 and assumed duty as harbor patrol vessel there. She continued to perform this duty until the end of World War I on 11 November 1918, after which she served the 15th Naval District as a patrol craft.

Herreshoff No. 306 was loaned to the United States Department of War on 2 October 1920 for use by the United States Army Air Service in the Canal Zone. She was returned to the Navy in March 1921.

Disposal
Herreshoff No. 306 was taken to Philadelphia, Pennsylvania, and placed on sale, finally being sold to W. A. D. Smith of New York City on 1 December 1922.

References

Department of the Navy Naval History and Heritage Command Online Library of Selected Images: U.S. Navy Ships: USS Herreshoff # 309 (SP-1218), 1917-1918
NavSource Online: Section Patrol Craft Photo Archive Herreshoff No. 306 (SP 1841)

Patrol vessels of the United States Navy
World War I patrol vessels of the United States
Ships built in Bristol, Rhode Island
1917 ships